The Avia B.135 (RLM designation Av-135) was a Czechoslovak cantilever monoplane fighter aircraft. It was the production version of the Avia B.35 developed shortly before the war, based on the B.35/3 prototype but featuring a new all-metal wing.

History
The B.135/1 prototype attracted the attention of Bulgarian Air Force officers visiting the Avia plant, and a production contract for 12 aircraft and 62 engines was signed, as well as a license to allow an additional 50 airframes to be constructed by DAR as the DAR 11 Lyastovitsa (Bulgarian: "Лястовица"; "Swallow"). However, the DAR facilities proved to be incapable of producing the aircraft, and only the 12 Czech-built examples were ever made. Plans for further production were stopped by the RLM, which also interrupted engine deliveries after 35 units, and the Bulgarian Air Force was encouraged to purchase the Messerschmitt Bf 109 instead.

Operational history
In service, the B.135s had continual engine problems and were soon relegated to training roles. Four aircraft did, however, see combat on 30 March 1944 when they intercepted USAAF bomber formations encroaching on Bulgarian airspace after attacking Ploieşti. Some (Bulgarian) sources credit Lieutenant Yordan Ferdinandov with a B-24 Liberator kill that morning. According to Bílý, all four Avias, led by Captain Atanasov, took part in the possible shooting down of a four-engined bomber that day. The downed aircraft crashed in the area of Tran and Breznik, according to the log of Lieutenant Yordan Ferdinandov.

Operators

Czechoslovak Air Force

Bulgarian Air Force

Specifications (B.135)

See also

Notes

Bibliography

 
 Taylor, Michael J. H. Jane's Encyclopedia of Aviation. London: Studio Editions, 1989.
 World Aircraft Information Files. London: Bright Star Publishing. (pages=File 889 Sheet 85)

External links

 The Great Planes: Avia B-135 on www.tgplanes.com

Low-wing aircraft
Single-engined tractor aircraft
1930s Czechoslovakian fighter aircraft
B-135
DAR aircraft